The Lloyd Lewis House in Libertyville, Illinois is a Usonian house designed by Frank Lloyd Wright and built in 1939.  It was listed on the National Register of Historic Places in 1982. The client for this house was the editor of the Chicago Daily News. This is a two-story house located near the Des Plaines River.

References

Storrer, William Allin. The Frank Lloyd Wright Companion. University Of Chicago Press, 2006,  (S.267)

External links
Photos on Arcaid
Sketch of the Lewis House
Photos of the Lewis House
Floorplan of the Lewis House

Houses completed in 1939
Frank Lloyd Wright buildings
Libertyville, Illinois
National Register of Historic Places in Lake County, Illinois
Houses on the National Register of Historic Places in Illinois
Houses in Lake County, Illinois